The Electoral district of Castlemaine and Maldon was an electoral district of the Victorian Legislative Assembly (Australia).

History
Castlemaine Boroughs was created in 1856 and abolished in 1859. It was replaced by Castlemaine in 1859 which was itself abolished in 1904, Harry Lawson being one of the two members since December 1899. Castlemaine and Maldon was created in 1904.

Members for Castlemaine and Maldon

Lawson was Premier of Victoria 21 March 1918 to 28 April 1924. The Electoral district of Castlemaine and Kyneton was created in 1927, Lawson being the first member.

Election results

See also
 Parliaments of the Australian states and territories
 List of members of the Victorian Legislative Assembly

References

Former electoral districts of Victoria (Australia)
1904 establishments in Australia
1927 disestablishments in Australia